The 2018 OFC Champions League group stage was played from 10 February to 3 March 2018. A total of 16 teams competed in the group stage to decide the eight places in the knockout stage of the 2018 OFC Champions League.

Draw
The draw for the group stage was held on 15 September 2017 at the OFC Headquarters in Auckland, New Zealand. The 16 teams (14 teams entering the group stage and two teams advancing from the qualifying stage) were drawn into four groups of four, with each group containing two teams from Pot B (which were drawn into positions 1–2 to determine the fixtures) and two teams from Pot C (which were drawn into positions 3–4 to determine the fixtures). Teams from the same association, as well as the two teams advancing from the qualifying stage, could not be drawn into the same group. The teams were seeded based on the following:
Pot B contained the champions of the seven developed associations, and the runners-up of New Zealand, by virtue of having the best second team in the 2017 OFC Champions League.
Pot C contained the runners-up of the six developed associations apart from New Zealand, and the two teams advancing from the qualifying stage, whose identity was not known at the time of the draw.
The following were the winners and runners-up of the qualifying stage which join the 14 direct entrants in the group stage.

Format
The four teams in each group played each other on a round-robin basis at a centralised venue. The winners and runners-up of each group advanced to the quarter-finals of the knockout stage.

Schedule
The hosts of each group were announced by OFC on 31 October 2017.
Group A matches were played between 10 and 16 February 2018 in Port Vila, Vanuatu.
Group B matches were played between 11 and 17 February 2018 in Pirae, Tahiti.
Group C matches were played between 25 February – 3 March 2018 in Auckland, New Zealand.
Group D matches were played between 24 February – 2 March 2018 in Honiara, Solomon Islands.
The schedule of each matchday was as follows.

Groups

Group A
All times were local, VUT (UTC+11).

Group B
All times were local, TAHT (UTC−10).

Group C
All times were local, NZDT (UTC+13).

Group D
All times were local, SBT (UTC+11).

Notes

References

External links
OFC Champions League 2018, oceaniafootball.com

2
February 2018 sports events in Oceania
March 2018 sports events in Oceania
International association football competitions hosted by Vanuatu
International association football competitions hosted by French Polynesia
International association football competitions hosted by New Zealand
International association football competitions hosted by the Solomon Islands
2018 in Solomon Islands sport